Slipstream is a literary press, founded in 1980 in Niagara Falls, New York, that publishes poetry and short fiction by both new and established writers. Charles Bukowski, Sherman Alexie, Gerald Locklin, Wanda Coleman, Lyn Lifshin, David Chorlton, J.P. Dancing Bear, and Terry Godbey are among the many writers whose work has appeared in the pages of Slipstream magazine. The press also publishes books of poetry by individual writers.

The editors of Slipstream are Robert Borgatti, Dan Sicoli, and Livio Farallo.

External links
 Slipstream Press

Literary magazines published in the United States
Book publishing companies based in New York (state)
Small press publishing companies
Publishing companies established in 1980
Literary publishing companies
Magazines established in 1980
Magazines published in New York (state)